The  Seafarers Bridge  is a footbridge over the Yarra River between Docklands and South Wharf in Melbourne, Victoria, Australia.

The bridge connects the north and south banks of the river while providing a formal entrance to the Melbourne Convention and Exhibition Centre. The bridge main span is supported by steel ties connected to elliptical arches, with three arches on the north side and four arches on the south side.

The bridge was named in homage to the ‘Mission to Seafarers’ centre located nearby on the northern bank of the Yarra River and to represent Melbourne's rich maritime history.

External links

Seafarers Bridge at Grimshaw website
Seafarers Bridge at Brown Consulting website
Seafarers Bridge at City of Melbourne website

Bridges completed in 2009
Bridges over the Yarra River
Cable-stayed bridges in Australia
Pedestrian bridges in Melbourne
Steel bridges in Australia
2009 establishments in Australia
Buildings and structures in the City of Melbourne (LGA)
Transport in the City of Melbourne (LGA)